Northern Thrace or North Thrace, also called Bulgarian Thrace, constitutes the northern and largest part of the historical region of Thrace. It is located in Southern Bulgaria and includes the territory south of the Balkan Mountains and east of the Mesta River, bordering  Western Thrace and East Thrace in the south, and the Black Sea in the east. It encompasses Sredna Gora, the Upper Thracian Plain, and 90% of the Rhodopes. 

The climate ranges from continental to transitional continental and mountainous. The main rivers of the region are the Maritsa and its tributaries. Notable cities include Plovdiv, Burgas, Stara Zagora, Sliven, Haskovo, Yambol, Pazardzhik, Asenovgrad, Kardzhali, Dimitrovgrad, Kazanlak and Smolyan. Northern Thrace has an area of 42,073 km2.

The Ottoman Empire created the autonomous province of Eastern Rumelia in Northern Thrace in 1878. The region was annexed by the Principality of Bulgaria in 1885.

Demographics 
The ethnic composition of the population of Eastern Rumelia.

The population's ethnic composition in the Bulgarian provinces of Burgas, Haskovo, Kardzhali, Pazardzhik, Plovdiv, Sliven, Smolyan, Stara Zagora and Yambol.

See also
 Eastern Thrace
 Western Thrace

References

 
Historical regions in Bulgaria